Wolf to the Slaughter is a novel by British crime-writer Ruth Rendell, first published in 1967. It is the third book in the popular Inspector Wexford series. A mini-series adapted from the novel was produced by Television South in 1987.

References 

1967 British novels
Novels by Ruth Rendell
Inspector Wexford series
John Long Ltd books